The William F. Tuckerman House is a historic house located at 63 Harvard Avenue in Brookline, Massachusetts.

Description and history 
The -story wood-frame house was built in 1856, and is a well-preserved local example of high-style Italianate design. It has a low-pitch gable roof, with dentil moulding in the gable eave, and a round-arch window near the apex of the gable. The roof cornice has paired brackets, and the front porch, which extends across the three-bay front of the main block, is supported by square posts with brackets.

The house was listed on the National Register of Historic Places on October 17, 1985.

See also
National Register of Historic Places listings in Brookline, Massachusetts

References

Houses in Brookline, Massachusetts
Italianate architecture in Massachusetts
Houses completed in 1856
National Register of Historic Places in Brookline, Massachusetts
Houses on the National Register of Historic Places in Norfolk County, Massachusetts